The Ignaz-Glaser-Symposium has been carried out since 2006 in Bürmoos near Salzburg, Austria by the Salzburger Bildungswerk.

Bürmoos was founded by the Prague Entrepreneur, Ignaz Glaser in the 1880s. Therefore the town of Bürmoos is a relatively young town compared to the other establishments in the neighbourhood.
As Bürmoos has emerged through immigration and has consistently grown, the integration of new citizens is positively perceived.

This Symposium, led by Andreas Maislinger, will annually take place at the end of April and be devoted to the issue of integration.

UNITED for Intercultural Action included the 1. Ignaz-Glaser-Symposium as 'good practice' in its 'Calendar of Internationalism', a project which publishes information about important events, seminars, training courses conferences, demonstrations, exhibitions, festivals etc. in the field of anti-racism, anti-nationalism, anti-fascism, support of migrants and refugees and human rights.

Anti-fascism in Austria
Anti-racism in Austria
Anti-nationalism in Europe